Chapel Island is an island in Bras d'Or Lake on Cape Breton Island, Nova Scotia, Canada. Its name in the kylee Miꞌkmaq language is Mniku but other names such as Vachlouacadie ("place of running water / running spirits") and Pastukopajitkewe'kati which translates to "sea cow place".

It is the capital, or fire, of Miꞌkmaꞌki within its home district of Unama'ki. The island is a sacred Indigenous site and home of St. Anne Mission, an important pilgrimage site for the Mi'kmaq and a place of national historic significance. The island is a National Historic Site of Canada and is part of the Chapel Island First Nation (Potlotek).

See also
List of National Historic Sites of Canada in Nova Scotia

References

Mi'kmaq in Canada
Landforms of Richmond County, Nova Scotia
Islands of Nova Scotia
National Historic Sites in Nova Scotia